William Holder (born November 17, 1975 in Orange, New Jersey) is a former Arena Football League defensive back and wide receiver.

Holder attended Monmouth University, in West Long Branch, New Jersey, where he majored in Political Science. At the time of his graduation, Holder was the all-time leading receiver in Monmouth program history with 115 catches for 2,309 yards and 25 touchdowns.

Holder spent the 2002 Arena Football League season on the practice squad of the New Jersey Gladiators. He joined the New York Dragons in 2003, playing there for five seasons. He then played for the Kansas City Brigade in 2008. In 2005, he joined the Oakland Raiders at their NFL training camp.

Notes

External links
 Stats at ArenaFan

1975 births
Living people
American football wide receivers
American football cornerbacks
American football return specialists
Monmouth Hawks football players
New York Dragons players
Kansas City Brigade players
People from Orange, New Jersey